North East Fife  is a constituency of the Scottish Parliament (Holyrood) covering part of the council area of Fife. It elects one Member of the Scottish Parliament (MSP) by the plurality (first past the post) method of election. It is additionally one of nine constituencies in the Mid Scotland and Fife electoral region, which elects seven additional members, in addition to the nine constituency MSPs, to produce a form of proportional representation for the region as a whole.

The seat has been held since the 2016 Scottish Parliament election by Willie Rennie, the former leader of the Scottish Liberal Democrats.

Electoral region 

The other eight constituencies of the Mid Scotland and Fife region are Clackmannanshire and Dunblane, Dunfermline, Cowdenbeath, Kirkcaldy, Mid Fife and Glenrothes, Perthshire North, Perthshire South and Kinross-shire and Stirling.

The region covers all of the Clackmannanshire council area, all of the Fife council area, all of the Perth and Kinross council area and all of the Stirling council area.

Constituency boundaries and council area 

Fife is represented in the Scottish Parliament by five constituencies, Cowdenbeath, Dunfermline, Kirkcaldy, Mid Fife and Glenrothes and North East Fife.

The  constituency was created at the same time as the Scottish Parliament, in 1999, with the name and boundaries of a pre-existing Westminster (House of Commons) constituency. In 2005, however, Scottish Westminster constituencies were mostly replaced with new constituencies. The Fife North East Westminster constituency was slightly enlarged.

From the 2011 Scottish Parliament election, the reshaped North East Fife constituency was formed from the following electoral wards, all of which are part of Fife:

Cupar
East Neuk and Landward
Howe of Fife and Tay Coast
St Andrews
Tay Bridgehead

Member of the Scottish Parliament

Election results

2020s

2010s

2000s

1990s

Footnotes

External links

Constituencies of the Scottish Parliament
1999 establishments in Scotland
Constituencies established in 1999
Politics of Fife
Scottish Parliament constituencies and regions 1999–2011
Scottish Parliament constituencies and regions from 2011
St Andrews
Cupar
Pittenweem
Auchtermuchty
Crail